Howson Peak is a mountain in west central British Columbia, Canada, located  southwest of Telkwa and southwest of the head of Telkwa River. This prominent mountain is the highest of the Howson Range. Howson Peak was first climbed in 1958 after an accident during a 1957 attempt in which Rex Gibson, then president of the Alpine Club of Canada, was killed. That route, as well as many other lines, remains unclimbed. The mountain is now in Tazdli Wiyez Bin or Burnie-Shea Provincial Park. Access is by air to Burnie Lake or on foot from the Kitnayakwa River road. The Burnie Glacier Chalet is the nearest accommodation.

See also
List of Ultras of North America

References

Sources
 
 Canadian Alpine Journal 1957 and 1958
 

Hazelton Mountains
Two-thousanders of British Columbia
Range 5 Coast Land District